Small Star Cinema is a series of live-action/animated shorts broadcast on CBC Television from April 12, 1974 to May 24, 1975 as part of their Bagatelle, Camera Twelve and Children's Cinema series. It was produced by Michael Hirsh and Patrick Loubert, and starred Clive A. Smith. Each short began with a small animated character purposefully walking into a spotlight. The series was then followed by the 1975 Christmas special Christmas Two Step also made for the CBC that has a similar premise.

Small Star Cinema was one of the first productions made by Canada's Nelvana Limited; known as Nelvana Films at the time, and was their first television program. All 10 of the Small Star Cinema shorts have been documented online, however, almost all of the shorts have been lost. Only one short, "Mr. Pencil Draws the Line", broadcast on April 12, 1975, has been recovered, and can be found on YouTube as of January 2020.

Episodes

References

1970s Canadian children's television series
Television series by Nelvana
1974 Canadian television series debuts
1975 Canadian television series endings
Canadian television series with live action and animation